Naich can refer to:

Naich, Jhelum, a village in Punjab, Pakistan
Naich clan, a tribe in the Sindh, Khyber Pakhtunkhwa and Punjab provinces of Pakistan

See also
Naiche (c. 1857–1919), an Apache Indian chief